Kaliski is Kalisz County (powiat kaliski), an administrative area in central Poland.

Kaliski may also refer to:

Places
Kaliski, Gmina Paprotnia, a village in Masovian Voivodeship, east-central Poland
Kaliski, Gmina Przesmyki, a village in Masovian Voivodeship, east-central Poland
Kaliski, Podlaskie Voivodeship, a village in north-east Poland
Kałyški, a village in Vitebsk Region, east-central Belarus

People with the surname
Burt Kaliski, American cryptographer
Sylwester Kaliski (1925–1978), Polish engineer and general

See also
 Kalisz (disambiguation)